Apparatus ad omnium gentium historiam (Apparatus to the history of all peoples) (1597)

The author of this impressive bibliographical guide to the library of history, Antonio Possevino was a major figure in the diplomatic and intellectual life of the Counter Reformation. His Bibliotheca selecta 1593 announces a programmatic role for history as a guiding principle in his organization of his Jesuit encyclopedia "in Historia, in Disciplinis". Possevino's De Humana Historia, Book 16, is a first elaboration of his re-edition of the culture of the ars historica as part of a papally sanctioned programme of Catholic learning. In 1597 with the printer G.B.Ciotti of Venice Possevino expanded this material into a book with this ambitious title in seven parts. Possevino's title is in direct contest with the Methodus ad facilem historiarum cognitionem 1560 of Jean Bodin. His source for this work was the Artis Historicae Penus of the Basel printer Pietro Perna. Obscuring the uses he was to make of this heterodox source the Jesuit issued a censure of the work in  his Iudicium of 1592 and had had it placed on the Index librorum prohibitorum. Ciotti also printed the work translated in Italian by Possevino in 1598, Apparato all'historia di tutte le nationi et il modo di studiare la geografia. In 1602 there was a further edition, De Apparatu ad omnium gentium historia published in Venice which served as the text for an updated edition of the Bibliotheca selecta (Venice, 1603).

With this work Possevino refashioned the ars historica culture and literature of the Late Renaissance as a cornerstone of the Jesuit classicism of the Baroque. His work laid the foundation for a tradition of historical and bibliographical scholarship exemplified in the Bollandist scholars, Nathaniel Bacon's Bibliotheca scriptorum Societatis Iesu, the histories of Daniello Bartoli and other landmarks of Jesuit historiography, such as the Monumenta Historica Societatis Iesu.

References

Published bibliographies
Jesuit historiography
1597 books